The La Palma Correctional Facility is a privately owned and managed medium-security detention center for men, located in Eloy, Pinal County, Arizona, under contract with ICE.

The facility opened in 2008, and houses 3060 immigrants.

La Palma is adjacent to three other prisons also run by CoreCivic: the Eloy Detention Center, the Red Rock Correctional Center, and the Saguaro Correctional Center.

References

Prisons in Arizona
Buildings and structures in Pinal County, Arizona
CoreCivic
2008 establishments in Arizona